The Thomas and Mary Williams Homestead, near Taylor, Nebraska, has significance dating to 1884.  Its  property was listed on the National Register of Historic Places in 1998 with seven contributing buildings and three other contributing structures.

Thomas Williams was an American Civil War veteran.  The property, which includes a log house, is located approximately 0.5 miles east of Taylor.

References

Houses on the National Register of Historic Places in Nebraska
Houses completed in 1884
Buildings and structures in Loup County, Nebraska
National Register of Historic Places in Loup County, Nebraska